Joyas de dos siglos (English Gems of two centuries) is the eleventh studio album by Mexican pop singer, Ana Gabriel. It was released on 1995. This material was produced by herself and Diana Veronica Paredes. This album is somewhat of a departure from Gabriel's usual style, but it is one of the artistic high points of her career. It was nominated for Regional Mexican Album of the Year at the Lo Nuestro Awards of 1996.

Track listing
Tracks:
 Clemencia 03:14
 Un Viejo Amor 03:17
 Aburrido Me Voy 02:59
 Ya Se Va la Embarcación 02:24
 Despedida 02:55
 Reconciliación 03:15
 Hay Unos Ojos 02:57
 Flor Triste 02:39
 Boda Negra 03:47
 Marchita el Alma 03:26
 Orilla de Un Palmar 03:36
 Pobre Bohemio 02:58
 Adiós Mi Chaparrita 03:08
 Barca de Oro 02:58
 Valentín de la Sierra 03:25

Album charts

 Note: This release reached the #5 position in Regional Mexican Albums staying for 17 weeks  and it reached the #12 position in the Billboard Top Latin Albums staying for 23 weeks in the chart.

Sales and certifications

References

1995 albums
Ana Gabriel albums